Grace Min was the defending champion, but lost in the first round to Asia Muhammad.

Muhammad went on to win the title, defeating Ann Li in the final, 7–5, 6–1.

Seeds

Draw

Finals

Top half

Bottom half

References
Main Draw

Kentucky Bank Tennis Championships - Singles
Lexington Challenger